David Wagner defeated Andrew Lapthorne in the final, 2–6, 6–1, 6–4 to win the quad singles wheelchair tennis title at the 2013 Australian Open.

Peter Norfolk was the reigning champion, but did not participate.

Draw

Final

Round robin
Standings are determined by: 1. number of wins; 2. number of matches; 3. in two-players-ties, head-to-head records; 4. in three-players-ties, percentage of sets won, or of games won; 5. steering-committee decision.

References
 Draw

Wheelchair Quad Singles
2013 Quad Singles